Olynyk is a surname.  Notable people with the surname include:

Brent Olynyk (born 1971), Canadian badminton player
Kelly Olynyk (born 1991), Canadian basketball player
Patricia Olynyk, Canadian-born American multimedia artist, scholar, and educator

See also
 

Ukrainian-language surnames